Dex Elmont (born 10 January 1984 in Rotterdam) is a Dutch retired judoka.

His father Ricardo is a former judoka himself, who represented Suriname at the 1976 Summer Olympics in Montreal, Quebec, Canada. His older brother Guillaume is also competing on the highest level in judo.

Achievements

References

External links
 
 

1984 births
Living people
Dutch male judoka
Dutch sportspeople of Surinamese descent
Sportspeople from Rotterdam
Olympic judoka of the Netherlands
Judoka at the 2008 Summer Olympics
Judoka at the 2012 Summer Olympics
Judoka at the 2016 Summer Olympics
European Games competitors for the Netherlands
Judoka at the 2015 European Games